Richard Audoly (born 6 March 1943) is a French former swimmer. He competed in the men's 200 metre breaststroke at the 1960 Summer Olympics.

References

External links
 

1943 births
Living people
Olympic swimmers of France
Swimmers at the 1960 Summer Olympics
Swimmers from Marseille
French male breaststroke swimmers